Neillsville is a city in Clark County in the U.S. state of Wisconsin. The population was 2,384 at the 2020 census. It is the county seat.

History
The Ojibwa were the earliest known residents of the Neillsville area.

The first settlers of European descent in the area were James O'Neill and his party, who arrived around 1845, looking for a location to build a sawmill along the Black River. The city was named in honor of O'Neill, as was O'Neill Creek, which runs through the center of the city and drains into the Black River.

In 1854, O’Neill's Mill, as Neillsville was originally called, was selected as the county seat of Clark County.

Neillsville was platted on April 14, 1855 and incorporated in April 1882.

Neillsville is where noted architect William L. Steele died. Poor health had forced Steele to retire from architecture in late 1946, leaving his eldest son William L. Steele, Jr. and partner Josiah D. Sandham in charge of the practice. Steele had come to Neillsville to live with one of his daughters, Sallie (Mrs. Thomas S. Noble, Jr.), and died at her house on March 4, 1949.

Geography
Neillsville is located at  (44.560996, -90.595746).

The city lies on US Highway 10 and State Trunk Highway 73.

Demographics

2010 census
As of the census of 2010, there were 2,463 people, 1,095 households, and 586 families living in the city. The racial makeup of the city was 96.2% White, 0.4% African American, 0.7% Native American, 1.1% Asian, 0.9% from other races, and 0.7% from two or more races. Hispanic or Latino of any race were 2.3% of the population.

There were 1,095 households, of which 24.7% had children under the age of 18 living with them, 39.1% were married couples living together, 10.5% had a female householder with no husband present, 3.9% had a male householder with no wife present, and 46.5% were non-families. 42.3% of all households were made up of individuals, and 22.8% had someone living alone who was 65 years of age or older. The average household size was 2.13 and the average family size was 2.92.

The median age in the city was 43.6 years. 21.8% of residents were under the age of 18; 8.5% were between the ages of 18 and 24; 21.3% were from 25 to 44; 24.7% were from 45 to 64; and 23.7% were 65 years of age or older. The gender makeup of the city was 46.6% male and 53.4% female.

2000 census
As of the census of 2000, there were 2,731 people, 1,130 households, and 653 families living in the city. The population density was 975.3 people per square mile (376.6/km2). There were 1,200 housing units at an average density of 428.5 per square mile (165.5/km2). The racial makeup of the city was 96.78% White, 0.15% African American, 1.10% Native American, 1.24% Asian, 0.04% Pacific Islander, 0.26% from other races, and 0.44% from two or more races. Hispanic or Latino of any race were 0.95% of the population.

There were 1,130 households, out of which 27.1% had children under the age of 18 living with them, 44.5% were married couples living together, 10.1% had a female householder with no husband present, and 42.2% were non-families. 38.1% of all households were made up of individuals, and 21.3% had someone living alone who was 65 years of age or older. The average household size was 2.24 and the average family size was 2.99.

In the city, the population was spread out, with 25.3% under the age of 18, 7.0% from 18 to 24, 24.2% from 25 to 44, 18.7% from 45 to 64, and 24.8% who were 65 years of age or older. The median age was 40 years. For every 100 females, there were 86.2 males. For every 100 females age 18 and over, there were 79.3 males.

The median income for a household in the city was $29,969, and the median income for a family was $41,076. Males had a median income of $30,523 versus $20,379 for females. The per capita income for the city was $16,298. About 6.3% of families and 10.3% of the population were below the poverty line, including 6.8% of those under age 18 and 8.9% of those age 65 or over.

Transportation
Neillsville is served by the Neillsville Municipal Airport (KVIQ).

Education
Neillsville has a public K-12 school system, consisting of Neillsville Elementary School, Neillsville Middle School, and Neillsville High School, whose mascot is the Neillsville Warriors. Neillsville is also home to St. John's Lutheran School, a private school for grades K-8 of the Wisconsin Evangelical Lutheran Synod.

In addition, the Chippewa Valley Technical College has a regional center in Neillsville, which offers GED, associate's degree, and continuing education classes.

Points of interest
The High Ground is a veterans' memorial park located west of Neillsville. Originally a memorial to Vietnam War veterans, it now includes memorials to World War I, World War II, and Korean War veterans.

The Clark County Jail, now a museum, and the Reed School, now a museum, are on the National Register of Historic Places.

The Wisconsin Pavilion from the 1964 New York World's Fair was moved to Neillsville at the conclusion of the Fair. The building is now home to local radio station WCCN/WCCN-FM and a gift shop. Chatty-Belle is a large cow statue located on the ground of the Wisconsin Pavilion. She has the distinction of being the World's Largest Talking Cow.

See also 
 National Register of Historic Places in Clark County, Wisconsin

References

External links

 City of Neillsville official website
 Neillsville Area Chamber of Commerce
 School District of Neillsville
 Historical & Architectural Tour Of Neillsville
 Sanborn fire insurance maps:  1887 1892 1903 1914

Cities in Wisconsin
Cities in Clark County, Wisconsin
County seats in Wisconsin